Orlando Bennett (born 12 October 1999) is a Jamaican hurdler.

He qualified for the 2019 World Athletics Championships in Doha where he made the 110 metres hurdles semifinals.
With 13.27 (June 2019), he is a qualifier at the 2020 Summer Olympics. He won the 110 m hurdles gold medal in the 2021 NACAC U23 Championships.

References

External links

Jamaican male hurdlers
World Athletics Championships athletes for Jamaica
1999 births
Living people
20th-century Jamaican people
21st-century Jamaican people